Saint-Michel-en-Grève is a commune in the Côtes-d'Armor department of Brittany in northwestern France.

In 2009 huge quantities of sea lettuce seaweed (Ulva lactuca) washed up on the beach at Saint Michel. Poisonous gases resulting from its decomposition caused the death of a horse and may have been a factor in the earlier death of a cleanup crew truck driver.

Population

Inhabitants of Saint-Michel-en-Grève are called michelois  in French.

See also
Communes of the Côtes-d'Armor department

References

External links

Communes of Côtes-d'Armor